Şeref Tüfenk (born September 22, 1983, in Rize) is a Turkish amateur Greco-Roman wrestler, who competed for the men's middleweight category. He is a two-time Olympian and a silver medalist for the 74 kg division at the 2008 European Wrestling Championships in Tampere, Finland. He studied at Ondokuz Mayıs University.

Tufenk made his official debut for the 2004 Summer Olympics in Athens, where he placed second in the preliminary pool of the men's lightweight class (60 kg), against Cuba's Roberto Monzón, Iran's Ali Ashkani, and Greece's Christos Gikas. In 2005, he won the gold medal at the Summer Universiade in İzmir, Turkey.

At the 2008 Summer Olympics in Beijing, Tufenk switched to a heavier class by competing in the men's 74 kg division. Unfortunately, he lost the qualifying round match to Azerbaijan's Ilgar Abdulov, with a two-set technical score (1–2, 1–1), and a classification point score of 1–3.

He also defeated France's Christophe Guénot for the gold medal in the same division at the 2009 Mediterranean Games in Pescara, Italy.

References

External links
 

Turkish male sport wrestlers
1983 births
Living people
Olympic wrestlers of Turkey
Wrestlers at the 2004 Summer Olympics
Wrestlers at the 2008 Summer Olympics
Sportspeople from Rize
Ondokuz Mayıs University alumni
Mediterranean Games gold medalists for Turkey
Competitors at the 2009 Mediterranean Games
Universiade medalists in wrestling
Mediterranean Games medalists in wrestling
Universiade gold medalists for Turkey
Medalists at the 2005 Summer Universiade
20th-century Turkish people
21st-century Turkish people